Armando Brambilla (21 January 1942 – 24 December 2011) was the Roman Catholic titular bishop of Ioninum and auxiliary bishop of the Diocese of Rome, Italy.

Ordained to the priesthood in 1977, Brambilla became bishop in 1994.

Notes

20th-century Italian titular bishops
Bishops in Lazio
1942 births
2011 deaths
21st-century Italian titular bishops